Lotti Höner (born 19 August 1928) is a Swiss former figure skater. She competed in the ladies' singles event at the 1948 Winter Olympics.

References

1928 births
Possibly living people
Swiss female single skaters
Olympic figure skaters of Switzerland
Figure skaters at the 1948 Winter Olympics
Place of birth missing (living people)